Corinna Harney (born February 20, 1972) is an American model and actress. She was chosen as Playboy's Playmate of the Month for August 1991 and Playboy's Playmate of the Year for 1992. Harney is sometimes credited as Corina Harney, Corinna Harney-Jones, or Corinna Harney Jones.

Career
Harney considers her start in the entertainment industry when she took her first ballet class at three years old. Her first acting job was when she was in the fourth grade with Dick Van Patten for a Blue Cross-Blue Shield commercial. She had also begun doing print modeling around that same time.

After her first appearance in Playboy, Harney was featured in a series of Playboy videos, as well as appearing in minor roles in television series such as Nash Bridges and CSI and the movie National Lampoon's Vegas Vacation.

After appearing in various roles, she and a friend produced a film called Pitcher and the Pin-up. Harney has worked on or had roles in a series of projects since, including a web-series called Wedded Bliss, a film called The Ivory Curse, a Sinclair Oil commercial, a movie called Ryder and Julina, and an independent film called Sins of our Youth, which also features Super 8 actor Joel Courtney.

Personal life
Harney was born in Bremerhaven, West Germany of Cherokee-Irish descent. She is the sister of Dorinda Harney. Harney spent most of her childhood life in Las Vegas, Nevada, where her father was a state trooper for the Nevada Highway Patrol. Harney graduated from Bonanza High School in Las Vegas.

She now lives in the Los Angeles Area, but she also maintains a home in Las Vegas. Harney is married and has a daughter.

Filmography

Feature films
Pitcher and the Pin-up a.k.a. The Road Home (2003)
Rat Race (2001) (as Corinna Harney Jones)
Vegas Vacation (1997) (as Corinna Harney Jones)
Vampirella (1996)

TV guest appearances
CSI: Crime Scene Investigation playing "Girl Gone Wild" (as Corinna Harney Jones) in episode: "The Accused Is Entitled" (episode # 3.2) October 3, 2002
Nash Bridges playing "Waitress" (as Corinna Harney-Jones) in episode: "Jackpot: Part 2" (episode # 5.22) May 19, 2000
High Tide in episode: "Mermaid" (episode # 2.5) October 22, 1995
Speeders on Tru TV

References

External links
 

1972 births
20th-century American actresses
21st-century American actresses
Living people
People from Bremerhaven
People from the Las Vegas Valley
1990s Playboy Playmates
Playboy Playmates of the Year
Western High School (Nevada) alumni
American people of Cherokee descent
American people of Irish descent